King Fu is one of the 25 constituencies of the Wong Tai Sin District Council in Hong Kong. The seat elects one member of the council every four years. The seat was held by Rosanda Mok from 2020 to 2021.

Councillors represented

Election results

2010s

2000s

1990s

Citations

References
2011 District Council Election Results (Wong Tai Sin)
2007 District Council Election Results (Wong Tai Sin)
2003 District Council Election Results (Wong Tai Sin)
1999 District Council Election Results (Wong Tai Sin)
 

Constituencies of Hong Kong
Constituencies of Wong Tai Sin District Council
1994 establishments in Hong Kong
Constituencies established in 1994
Ngau Chi Wan